Więckowice  is a village in the administrative district of Gmina Dopiewo, within Poznań County, Greater Poland Voivodeship, in west-central Poland.

On April 10, 2020, a case of African Swine Fever near the village was reported on a local commercial pig farm which is the second case of ASF in the country involving a commercial pig farm.

References

Villages in Poznań County